The Fire and Rescue Services Act 2004 (c 21), sometimes abbreviated as FRSA 2004, is an Act of the Parliament of the United Kingdom.

It came into effect on 1 October 2004.  It only applies to Great Britain and most provisions apply only in England and Wales.  Replacing the previous Fire Services Act 1947 in England and Wales, it clarifies the duties and powers of fire authorities to:-

promote fire safety
fight fires
protect people and property from fires
rescue people from road traffic Collision
deal with other specific emergencies, such as flooding or terrorist attack and
do other things to respond to the particular needs of their communities and the risks they face.

Section 44
Sections 44(3) and (4) were repealed on 20 February 2007 by section 6 of the Emergency Workers (Obstruction) Act 2006.

Section 61 - Commencement
The following orders have been made under this section:
The Fire and Rescue Services Act 2004 (Commencement) (England and Scotland) Order 2004 (S.I. 2004/2304 (C. 100))
The Fire and Rescue Services Act 2004 (Commencement) (Wales) Order 2004 (S.I. 2004/2917 (W. 256) (C. 121))

References
Halsbury's Statutes,

External links
 Office of the Deputy Prime Minister - Information on the act
The Fire and Rescue Services Act 2004, as amended from the National Archives.
The Fire and Rescue Services Act 2004, as originally enacted from the National Archives.
Explanatory notes to the Fire and Rescue Services Act 2004.

2004 in Scotland
Acts of the Parliament of the United Kingdom concerning England and Wales
Acts of the Parliament of the United Kingdom concerning Scotland
United Kingdom Acts of Parliament 2004
Fire prevention law
Emergency management in the United Kingdom
Fire and rescue in the United Kingdom